The Stegophilinae are a subfamily of catfishes (order Siluriformes) of the family Trichomycteridae. It includes 12 genera: Acanthopoma, Apomatoceros, Haemomaster, Henonemus, Homodiaetus, Megalocentor, Ochmacanthus, Parastegophilus, Pareiodon, Pseudostegophilus, Schultzichthys, and Stegophilus. A monophyletic group within the Stegophilinae is supported by two characteristics of the lateral line, including Acanthopoma, Henonemus, Megalocentor, Pareiodon, Parastegophilus, and Pseudostegophilus. Acanthopoma and Henonemus have a sister group relationship.

The Stegophilinae are widely distributed in the main South American river basins, including the Amazon, Orinoco, São Francisco, Paraná-Paraguay, and those of southern Brazil. Eight of the genera are distributed in Venezuela.

Stegophilines are sometimes considered candirú, so are considered parasites or semiparasites, because of their peculiar habit of feeding on scales, mucus, or skin of other fishes.

References

Trichomycteridae
Fish of South America
Fish subfamilies
Taxa named by Albert Günther